Keith Downey may refer to:

 Keith Downey (agricultural scientist) (born 1927), Canadian agricultural scientist
 Keith Downey (politician) (born 1960), Minnesota politician